The following tables show state-by-state results in the Australian Senate at the 1998 federal election. Senators total 34 coalition (31 Liberal, two coalition National, one CLP), 29 Labor, one Green, one non-coalition National, nine Democrats, one Independent and one One Nation. Senator terms are six years (three for territories), and took their seats from 1 July 1999, except the territories who took their seats immediately.

Australia

New South Wales

Victoria

Queensland

Western Australia

South Australia

Tasmania

Australian Capital Territory

Northern Territory

See also 
 Candidates of the 1998 Australian federal election
 Members of the Australian Senate, 1999–2002

References

Senate 1998
Senate 1998
Australian Senate elections